Tui (also Romanized as Tū'ī) is a village in Dasht Rural District, Silvaneh District, Urmia County, West Azerbaijan Province, Iran. At the 2006 census, its population was 81, in 15 families.

References 

Populated places in Urmia County